Holwan may refer to:

Hulwan, Iran
Helwan, Egypt